Galahad at Blandings  is a novel by P. G. Wodehouse, first published in the United States on 31 December 1964 by Simon & Schuster, Inc., New York under the title The Brinkmanship of Galahad Threepwood, and in the United Kingdom on 26 August 1965 by Herbert Jenkins, London.

It forms part of the Blandings Castle saga, being the ninth full-length novel to be set there.

Plot introduction 
Lord Emsworth's idyllic demesne, Blandings Castle, is as usual overrun with overbearing sisters, overefficient secretaries, and the lovestruck; even worse, an alleged old flame has appeared, determined to put an end to the Earl's peaceful, pig-loving existence. All Gally's genius is required to sort things out satisfactorily...

Plot summary

Galahad Threepwood is in residence at Blandings Castle, and finds his brother Lord Emsworth, the ninth Earl, beset by the usual collection of woes. His sister, Lady Hermione Wedge, has not only hired a secretary (Sandy Callender) to mind his affairs, but has also invited Dame Daphne Winkworth to stay and, as Galahad discovers, to reignite an old flame and take up permanent residence as the next Countess.

Joining the house party are Tipton Plimsoll, a young multimillionaire who is engaged to Lady Hermione's daughter Veronica, and Lady Hermione's nephew Wilfred Allsop, a struggling young pianist who is in love with Emsworth's pig-girl Monica Simmons. Wilfred and Tipton had met in New York several days earlier for an evening of dinner, drinks, and imprisonment. (They also met policeman Officer Garroway, from The Small Bachelor.) Wilfred has been engaged by Dame Daphne to teach music at her girls' school, a prospect that Wilfred cannot refuse but is also anxious about, as Dame Daphne is intolerant of drinking among her staff.

Galahad's chief task at Blandings is to deal with sundered hearts, namely those of Sandy and her now-ex-betrothed Sam Bagshott. Gally has known Sandy for years, and was good friends with Sam's father "Boko" Bagshott, and is disturbed at their falling-out over a minor matter of a bet in the Drones Club marriage sweepstakes. Sam needs £700 to fix up his inherited family seat and sell it (to Oofy Prosser), and has drawn Tipton in the race for the next to be married. The other front-runners have dropped out, and Sam believes he has a sure winner, as Lady Hermione will not let Veronica lose her a multimillionaire son-in-law. Sandy, who knew Tipton from working for his uncle Chet Tipton in New York, believes that this engagement will go the way of all his others, and is upset at Sam for not selling his stake to a syndicate that has offered a firm £100.

If Sam would come down to Blandings, Gally believes, and plead his case with Sandy, all would be resolved. But when Sam does so, his first accidental encounter with Sandy proves disastrous: he chases her, she eludes him, and in giving up the chase he is confronted by the local constabulary.  Constable Evans informs him, and he discovers that he cannot dispute, that in leaving the Emsworth Arms he made off with Sebastian Beach's gold pocket watch. (Beach had left it with the barmaid Marlene to admire, and she had been showing it to Sam when he spied Sandy). Already grumpy from Sandy's rebuff, Sam deals with the accusation by punching Constable Evans in the eye and fleeing on the constable's bicycle.

When Gally hears of this, he insists on bringing Sam into the Castle, and decides that he should enter under the name of Augustus Whipple, noted author of On The Care of the Pig, Emsworth's revered reference work for the care and feeding of his prize pig Empress of Blandings. On encountering Emsworth at the Empress' sty, Sam diagnoses her malady as not swine fever, but instead intoxication (from the contents of Wilfred's flask, intended to steel him for proposing to Monica Simmons but dropped when discovered by Dame Daphne's son Huxley.) In gratitude Emsworth invites Sam to stay at Blandings, while a boosted Wilfred wins his Monica.

Meanwhile, Lady Hermione has learned from Emsworth that Tipton had lost all his money in the stock market crash and is now impoverished. She rushes up to London to instruct Veronica to break the engagement in a letter to be delivered by the next post. When Colonel Wedge receives Tipton, who is driving a Rolls-Royce and brandishing an £8000 necklace for Vee, he asks Gally to intercept the letter, which Gally is pleased to do. Gally goes a step further and gives the letter to Sam. On Hermione's return, when Beach informs her that the man who stole his watch is at the Castle impersonating Augustus Whipple, Gally threatens to deliver the letter to Tipton unless Hermione allows Sam to stay. Hermione tries searching Sam's room, but only succeeds in losing Wilfed his job with Dame Daphne, when her son Huxley discovers him singing in the corridor as a signal to his aunt.

Sandy confronts Galahad, but ends up persuaded by him to take Sam back. They find him locked in the potting shed, where he has been imprisoned by Constable Evans. Sandy frees him from the shed and they are reconciled. But not all the couples remain happy: Emsworth discovers the fatal letter in his desk, where Gally had hidden it, and has it delivered to Tipton.  Gally has hard work convincing Tipton that Veronica meant not a word of it, and Tipton phones Veronica and the rift is mended as quickly as made.  Tipton takes Wilfred and Monica Simmons up to London to gather Vee and head to the registrar's for a double wedding.

Not everything is wrapped up, though.  Emsworth is still in peril of matrimony from Dame Daphne, Sam still has to collect on his winning ticket, and the Law still looms over Sam's shoulder.  Sandy hears that another Drones Club member has won the sweepstakes, and Sam's stake is worthless.  Lady Hermione, having discovered that the letter was delivered and nullified, now announces her intention to expose Sam; Gally leads her to the library where he claims Sam is, and locks her in.  He rushes to Emsworth, to touch him for the thousand pounds before Lady Hermione can summon aid.

He finds Emsworth rattled and deflated.  In Monica Simmons' absence, young Huxley attempts to release the Empress from her sty.  Having morning head after her bender, she responds by biting the lad's finger. Dame Winkworth deems her dangerous and demands that she be destroyed; Emsworth calls her a fool and telephones the veterinarian to find whether there was any risk of infection to the Empress. At that Dame Daphne leaves the household. Hermione, finding that Emsworth has driven away Dame Daphne, exposes Sam, declares Emsworth to be impossible to manage, and leaves as well.

The ninth Earl is reluctant now to lend money to an impostor, but Gally reminds him that he has now been freed of the threat of marriage to Dame Daphne, and of the supervision of their sister Hermione, and that if he lends the money to Sam all his troubles will be ended, as Sam will take his secretary out of his life. Emsworth gladly does so, and peace reigns over Blandings once again.

Characters 

 The Earl of Emsworth, the absent-minded master of Blandings
 The Hon. Galahad Threepwood, Emsworth's dashing brother
 Lady Hermione Wedge, Emsworth's short and dumpy sister
 Colonel Egbert Wedge, Hermione's doting husband
 Veronica Wedge, the Wedge's beautiful but simple daughter
 Wilfred Allsop, a nephew of Emsworth, a small pianist
 Empress of Blandings, Emsworth's prize pig
 Monica Simmons, Emsworth's pig girl, adored by Allsop
 Tipton Plimsoll, Veronica's wealthy American fiance
 Dame Daphne Winkworth, Emsworth's old flame, now headmistress of a girls' school
 Huxley Winkworth, Dame Daphne's unpleasant son
 Alexandra "Sandy" Callender, Emsworth's new, red-headed secretary
 Samuel Galahad Bagshott, son of an old friend of Gally, who loves Sandy
 Beach, long-serving butler at the Castle
 Constable Evans, the local policeman

Publication history

The first US edition dust jacket was illustrated by John Alcorn. The first UK edition dust jacket was illustrated by "Payne".

The US edition, The Brinkmanship of Galahad Threepwood, is dedicated: "To Scott Meredith, prince of literary agents and best of friends". Scott Meredith was an American literary agent.

Adaptations

In 1992, the story was adapted as a radio drama in four parts in the Blandings radio series.

The sixth episode of the first series of the Blandings television series, "Problems with Drink", was based on Galahad at Blandings and first aired on 17 February 2013.

References
Notes

Sources

External links 
 The Russian Wodehouse Society's page, with a full list of characters
 Fantastic Fiction's page, with details of published editions, photos of book covers and links to used copies

Novels by P. G. Wodehouse
1964 American novels
1965 British novels
Simon & Schuster books
Herbert Jenkins books
Pigs in literature
British comedy novels